The Cavemen (stylized as The Cavemen.) are a Nigerian Highlife band consisting of sibling duo Kingsley Okorie, a bassist and Benjamin James, a drummer. They were discovered by Lady Donli and are known for their live performances. They won the 2020 Headies Award for the Best Alternative Album.

Early life 
The Cavemen are natives of Orlu, Imo State and started out as choristers. Kingsley earned a law degree from Babcock University and Nigerian Law School's Kano campus. Benjamin however attended Peter King College of Music, Badagry, Lagos.

The Cavemen were officially formed in March 2018 and they stylised their band name with a dot to avoid lawsuits from a New-Zealand artiste with the trademarked name.

Career 
They released their debut single, ''Osondu'' in 2020 and released their debut album, Roots in August 2020. The album was recorded in their living room and was fully produced by the duo. They also produced 11 of the songs on Lady Donli's Enjoy Your Life album who in turn was a co-executive producer on Roots. They performed at the finale show of the fifth season of Big Brother Naija. The duo's sophomore album Love and Highlife was released in October 2021, with guest appearances from Cobhams Asuquo, Made Kuti, PC Lapez and Etuk Ubong.

Legacy 
The Cavemen. have often been praised for recreating highlife in a way which retains its essence. The writer, Michael Chiedoziem Chukwudera writes about Cavemen's second album for Afrocritik, “Love and Highlife” embodies an innovative effort to perfect the recreation of Highlife while remaining conservative. The combination of drums, trumpets, piano, and other supporting musical instruments creates a sound that retains the traditional essence of Highlife.

"The Cavemen. teaches us that innovation supersedes creating what is new—which is a beautiful thing to do—and that one can be innovative by taking what was there before and owning it.

"The subject of The Cavemen.’s music is love and philosophy. There is no talk of money, clothes, women, or inane vanities. This lends a purist quality to the music. The duo seems to have derived some of their philosophy from the music of Oliver De Coque; and even the third song in the album, “Biri” is a sample of Oliver De Coque’s classic “Biri ka m Biri,” a song which espouses the principle of “Live and Let live.” But even while they have borrowed from Oliver De Coque’s music, they have been careful to avoid adopting the praise of politicians and wealthy people in society, a style rife in Oliver De Coque’s music. Oliver de Coque as well as Osita Osadebe were pioneers of praise-singing for wealthy and sometimes corrupt individuals in the southeast. The music created by The Cavemen. is made so that it is self-sustaining. It does not pander to any clique, nor does it seek validation from any group of people."

 Discography

Studio albums

Singles

Videography 
Bena - 2020

Awards

References 

Nigerian highlife musicians
21st-century Nigerian musicians
Musicians from Imo State
Nigerian musical duos